Ithomi is a former municipality in the Karditsa regional unit, Thessaly, Greece. Since the 2011 local government reform it is part of the municipality Mouzaki, of which it is a municipal unit. The municipal unit has an area of 80.491 km2. Population 2,044 (2011). The seat of the municipality was in Fanari. The name reflects the ancient town of Ithome, which, although its location is uncertain, is thought to be located nearby. The  municipal unit Ithomi consists of the following communities:
 Agios Akakios
 Charma
 Ellinopyrgos
 Fanari
 Kanalia
 Kappas
 Loxada
 Pyrgos Ithomis

References

Populated places in Karditsa (regional unit)

el:Δήμος Μουζακίου#Ιθώμης